The 2022–23 Under 20 Elite League is an age-restricted association football tournament for national Under-20 teams. It is the fifth edition of the Under 20 Elite League.

Participating teams

League table

Results

Goalscorers

References

Under 20 Elite League
2022–23 in European football